Falsostesilea is a genus of longhorn beetles of the subfamily Lamiinae, containing the following species:

 Falsostesilea perforata (Pic, 1926)
 Falsostesilea puncticollis Breuning, 1940

References

Desmiphorini